The Order of Ouissam Alaouite or the  Sharifian Order of Al-Alaoui is a military decoration of Morocco which is bestowed by the King of Morocco upon those civilians and military officers who have displayed heroism in combat or have contributed meritorious service to the Moroccan state.  The decoration was established on 11 January 1913 in replacement of the Order of Ouissam Hafidien. It is awarded in five classes: Grand Cordon (Grand cordon), Grand Officer (Grand Officier), Commander (Commandeur), Officer (Officier) and Knight (Chevalier).

The Order of Ouissam Alaouite is similar to the Legion of Merit, awarded by the United States military.

History

The order of Ouissam Alaouite was created during the colonial period. The French authorities in Morocco considered it necessary to have the power to bestow an official honour or decoration in response to loyal service; and they wanted to avoid over-burdening the bureaucracy of the order of the Légion d'Honneur in Paris. The ribbon of the order during this period was a shade of orange or pumpkin-coloured. In 1934, a white stripe was added on each side of the ribbon.

During the Second World War, the Order of Ouissam Alaouite was bestowed frequently on United States military personnel who had participated in the planning and execution of Operation Torch, the invasion of French Morocco. Morocco was a protectorate of France from 1912 to 1956, and the decoration was bestowed frequently on French military officers during that period.

After Moroccan independence in 1956, the Alawid Order became a prerogative of the Alawid King and his heirs. The Order continues through the present day, the original medal and the 1934's ribbon unchanged.

Recipients 

 Albert I of Belgium
 Anthony Bailey (PR advisor)
 John Edwin Bircher III
 Paul Biya
 Luc Chatel
 Wesley Clark
 Ernest J. Dawley
 Paul Doury
 Émile-Joseph Duzer
 Thomas Scheen Falck
 Mohamed Habib Gherab
 Jean Gilles (French Army officer)
 Edvard Hambro
 René Imbot
 Jared Kushner
 Jean Joseph (soldier)
 Hubert Lyautey
 André Malraux
 Mohamed El Mansour
 Harry McLear
 Miguel Ángel Moratinos
 Saint-Just Pequart
 Francisco Pérez Pérez
 Bertrand Piccard
 Luis Planas
 René Pleven
 Michel Raingeard
 Elliott Roosevelt
 Dominique Strauss-Kahn
 Arthur Tedder, 1st Baron Tedder
 Jürgen Tönsmann
 Charles Tordjman
 Louis Vannier
 Geoffrey Weston
 Officers
 Mhamed Ben Abboud
 Dimitri Amilakhvari
 Robert Chastel
 Paul Arnaud de Foïard
 Vanessa Branson
 Henri Honoré d'Estienne d'Orves
 Pier Antonio Panzeri
 Xavier Rolet
 Yuri Senkevich
 Michael Zaoui
 Yoel Zaoui
 Knights
 Gustave Daladier
 Ayoub Qanir
 Ibrahim Latif 
 Grand Crosses
 Abbas II of Egypt
 Kenneth Anderson (British Army officer)
 Henry H. Arnold
 Bảo Đại
 Jean-Bédel Bokassa
 Mark W. Clark
 Henri Claudel
 Rachida Dati
 Dwight D. Eisenhower
 Ferdinand Foch
 Jaime Gama
 Alexander Godley
 Fortune FitzRoy, Duchess of Grafton
 Henrik, Prince Consort of Denmark
 Charles Huntziger
 Joseph Joffre
 Alphonse Juin
 Khalifa bin Salman Al Khalifa
 Marie-Pierre Kœnig
 Jacques Lanxade
 Jean de Lattre de Tassigny
 Philippe Leclerc de Hauteclocque
 Lucien Loizeau
 Margrethe II of Denmark
 Pakubuwana X 
 George Marshall
 Muhammad VIII al-Amin
 George S. Patton
 Friis Arne Petersen
 Jean-Bernard Raimond
 Thomas T. Riley
 Jagatjit Singh
 Walter Bedell Smith
 Witold Spirydowicz
 Jan Syrový
 Maxime Weygand
 Wu Bangguo
 Commanders
 Marcel Alessandri
 Georges Bergé
 Gaston Billotte
 Pierre Billotte
 Irina Bokova
 Thierry Breton
 Jérôme Champagne
 Pierre Clostermann
 Jean-Paul David
 Alain Delon
 Harold D. Harris
 Antoine Huré
 Georges Journois
 Curtis LeMay
 Richard Lugar
 John A. Lynn
 John McCain
 Manoel de Oliveira
 Berenice Owen-Jones
 Yves Pouliquen
 Ridley Scott
 Oliver Stone
 Peter Sutherland
 Joseph Vuillemin
 Grand Officers
 Cristian Barros
 Avi Berkowitz
 Inès de Bourgoing
 Ernesto Burzagli
 Eugène Claudius-Petit
 Willy Coppens
 Andrew Cunningham, 1st Viscount Cunningham of Hyndhope
 Jean-Philippe Douin
 Robert de Foy
 Ernest N. Harmon
 Thor Heyerdahl
 Raoul Magrin-Vernerey
 Maurice Pellé
 Benoît Puga
 Josef Šnejdárek
 Mariano Hugo, Prince of Windisch-Graetz

1943 ceremony

In the opening scene of the film Patton, George C. Scott, portraying then-Major General Patton, is shown receiving the Grand Cross of the Order of Ouissam Alaouite.  This was no mere Hollywood contrivance.  Under Patton's command, Allied forces took Casablanca after only four days of fighting.  So impressed was the Sultan of Morocco that he presented Patton with the special Order of Ouissam Alaouite, with the citation: "Les Lions dans leurs tanières tremblent en le voyant approcher" (The lions in their dens tremble at his approach). Patton wryly described the ceremony as a "non-military activity," but in his memoirs, he does not fail to note the Operation Torch staff officers who were similarly honored on that occasion.

Notes

References
 Bidwell, Robin Leonard. (1973). Morocco Under Colonial Rule: French Administration of Tribal Areas, 1912–1956. London: Routledge. 
 Wyllie, Robert E. (1921). Orders, Decorations and Insignia, Military and Civil: With the History and Romance of Their Origin and a Full Description of Each. New York: G. P. Putnam.
 Rousseau, Pierre. (2005) Ordres et décorations de l'Empire chérifien au temps du Protectorat français au Maroc (1912–1956). Versailles: Mémoire & Documents. ;  OCLC 60513643
Décret royal n° 199-66 du 1er ramadan 1386 (14 décembre 1966) portant création des ordres du Royaume – website of the government of Morocco 

Orders, decorations, and medals of Morocco
Awards established in 1913
1913 establishments in Morocco